The 1977 AFC Youth Championship was held between April 15 and April 28 in Iran. It was won by Iraq 4-3 over Iran in Aryamehr Stadium in Tehran in front of 100,000 spectators. Both teams qualified for 1977 FIFA World Youth Championship.

Teams
The following teams entered the tournament:

Venues

Group stage

Group A 

 8 - 0 

 3 - 0 

 0 - 0

Group B 

 4 - 0 

 3 - 0 

    4 - 0

Group C 

 5 - 0 

 1 - 1 

 3 - 1

Group D 

 2 - 0 

 0 - 0 

 0 - 0 

 1 - 1 

 3 - 0 

 3 - 0

Quarterfinals 

 3 - 0 

  5 - 1 

     0 - 0 
3-1 after penalties

     2 - 2 
5-6 after penalties

Semifinals 

  2 - 1 

  3 - 0

Third place match

   3 - 1

Final

Qualification to World Youth Championship
The two best performing teams qualified for the 1977 FIFA World Youth Championship.

External links
Details on RSSSF

1977 Asian Youth Championship
1977
1976–77 in Iranian football
Youth
1977 in youth association football